The Cabinet Secretariat of the Republic of Indonesia (also known as Setkab) is a government agency working directly beneath and answerable to the President of Indonesia. Its duties are to provide governance support for the president and vice president in managing the cabinet.

The Cabinet Secretariat is currently headed by Pramono Anung.

Duties 
As stated before, the Cabinet Secretariat is tasked with providing support to the office of the President and Vice President, especially regarding the management of the governing cabinet. In doing so, the Cabinet Secretariat run several functions, as follow.

 Providing analysis and recommendation on the government policies and programs;
 Providing solutions for deadlocked government policies and programs;
 Monitoring, evaluating, and control over the implementation of government policies and programs;
 Providing analysis and recommendation on ministerial/agency policy drafts which required presidential approval;
 Providing recommendation following general public observation and opinion gathering;
 Preparing, administering, implementing, and managing all cabinet sessions, meetings, or other gatherings led and/or attended by the president and/or vice president, as well as preparing their documents, translation services, and public relations and protocols service; 
 Providing consideration, technical, and administrative support in appointing, transferring, and dismissing high-ranking government officials;
 Training official translators functionary;
 Managing and developing human resource elements within the Cabinet Secretariat;
 Providing service and support concerning the administration of planning, finance, procurement, and management of state properties;
 Internal monitoring within the Cabinet Secretariat; and
 Other functions tasked by the president and/or vice president.

Organization 
The organizational structure of the Cabinet Secretariat is as follows.

Leadership elements 

 Cabinet Secretary who heads the entire agency and is a cabinet-level official
 Assistant Cabinet Secretary, tasked with assisting the Cabinet Secretary in coordinating the workflow of the Deputies, Advisors, and Special Staffs within the Secretariat

Deputies 

 Deputy on Political, Legal, and Security Affairs, tasked with assisting the Secretary in providing support in cabinet management on political, legal and security affairs. The deputy is assisted by:
 Assistant Deputy on Home Governance
 Assistant Deputy on Law, Human Rights, and State Apparatus
 Assistant Deputy on International Relations
 Assistant Deputy on Defense, Security, Communication, and Information Technology
 Deputy on Economic Affairs, tasked with assisting the Secretary in providing support in cabinet management on economic affairs. The Deputy is assisted by:
 Assistant Deputy on Macroeconomics, Development Planning, and Business Climate Development
 Assistant Deputy on Trade, Industry, and Manpower
 Assistant Deputy on Business and Area Development; and
 Assistant Deputy on Agriculture, Food Security, Research, and Technology
 Deputy on Human Development and Cultural Affairs, tasked with assisting the Secretary in providing support in cabinet management on human development and cultural affairs;
 Deputy on Maritime and Investment Affairs, tasked with assisting the Secretary in providing support in cabinet management on maritime and investment affairs. The Deputy is assisted by:
 Assistant Deputy on Maritime, Fishery, and Forestry;
 Assistant Deputy on Mineral Resource and the Environment;
 Assistant Deputy on Transportation and Public Works; and
 Assistant Deputy on Investment and Tourism.
 Deputy on Cabinet Support, tasked with assisting the Secretary in providing support in cabinet management on preparing, administering, implementing, and managing all cabinet sessions, meetings, or other gatherings led and/or attended by the president and/or vice president, as well as preparing their documents, translation services, and public relations and protocols service. The Deputy is assisted by:
 Assistant Deputy on Meetings Management
 Assistant Deputy on Meetings Report;
 Assistant Deputy on Public Relations and Protocols
 Assistant Deputy on Documents and Translations
 Deputy on Administrative Affairs, tasked with assisting the Secretary in providing support in cabinet management on managing and developing human resource elements within the Cabinet Secretariat, providing service and support concerning the administration of planning, finance, procurement, and management of state properties, as well as providing consideration, technical, and administrative support in appointing, transferring, and dismissing high-ranking government officials. The Deputy is assisted by:
 Bureau on Planning and Finance;
 Bureau on Human Resources, Organization, and Organizational Administration
 Bureau on Performance Accountability and Bureaucratic Reform
 Bureau on General Affairs

Advisors to the Secretary 

 Advisor to the Secretary on Economic Affairs and Public Welfare, tasked with providing recommendation on strategic and actual issues for the Cabinet Secretary on economic affairs and public welfare;
 Advisor to the Secretary on Political and Legal Affairs, tasked with providing recommendation on strategic and actual issues for the Cabinet Secretary on political and legal affairs;
 Advisor to the Secretary on Communication Affairs, tasked with providing recommendation on strategic and actual issues for the Cabinet Secretary on communication affairs; 
 Advisor to the Secretary on Bureaucratic Reform, tasked with providing recommendation on strategic and actual issues for the Cabinet Secretary on bureaucratic reform; and
 Advisor to the Secretary on Maritime, Investment, and International Relations, tasked with providing recommendation on strategic and actual issues for the Cabinet Secretary on maritime, investment, and international relations.

Inspectorate 
The Inspectorate is headed by an Inspector, and tasked with internal monitoring within the Cabinet Secretariat.

Centers 
Centers are other subdivisions within the Cabinet Secretariat, responsible to the Cabinet Secretary via the Deputy on Administrative Affairs.

 Data and IT Center, tasked with (1) managing data and information system, (2) developing and implementing information management system, (3) developing, maintaining, and securing information infrastructure, (4) disseminating data and information, (5) providing data and IT support in cabinet management, (6) promoting the utilization of information system and technology within the Cabinet Secretariat, (7) providing technical and administrative support on archive, documentation, and library management within the Cabinet Secretariat.
 Translator Functionary Fostering Center, tasked with managing, fostering, developing, and providing administrative support for the translators functionary.

Special Staffs to the Secretary 
Special Staffs to the Secretary are individuals working directly under the Cabinet Secretary, tasked with providing counsels and considerations for the Secretary regarding issues not within other subdivisions' functions.

List of cabinet secretaries 
Below is the list of Cabinet Secretaries of Indonesia since its formation in 1963.

Notes

References 

Government of Indonesia
Indonesia